Miquel Mayol i Raynal (born 11 August 1941) is a Spanish politician of French nationality who served as a Member of the European Parliament from 2001 to 2004 in Spanish lists.

Biography
Born in Perpignan, he taught law and was a founder of Catalan Workers' Left,. He later joined the Republican Left of Catalonia and was the secretary of their North Catalonia division.

In June 2001 he became a RLC member of the European Parliament in the Greens–European Free Alliance. He sat in the European Parliament until July 2004.

He was also an activist in promoting both the Catalan language and its culture., and was awarded the 2014  alongside Carme Forcadell i Lluís.

References

1941 births
Living people
Republican Left of Catalonia MEPs
MEPs for Spain 1999–2004
People from Perpignan
Activists from Catalonia